Ralph Heinze Flamand (born March 26, 1975) is a Mexican sprint canoer who competed in the mid-1990s. At the 1996 Summer Olympics in Atlanta, he was eliminated in the repechages of the K-2 500 m event.

References
Sports-Reference.com profile

1975 births
Canoeists at the 1996 Summer Olympics
Living people
Mexican male canoeists
Olympic canoeists of Mexico
Mexican people of Volga German descent
Mexican people of French descent